Midway is an unincorporated community in DeKalb County, Tennessee, United States.

References

Unincorporated communities in DeKalb County, Tennessee
Unincorporated communities in Tennessee